The 1992 Nigerian Senate election in Rivers State was held on July 4, 1992, to elect members of the Nigerian Senate to represent Rivers State. Denton West representing Rivers South-East, Felix Orobo representing Rivers West and Bennet Birrari representing Rivers East all won on the platform of the National Republican Convention.

Overview

Summary

Results

Rivers South-East 
The election was won by Denton West of the National Republican Convention.

Rivers West 
The election was won by Felix Orobo of the National Republican Convention.

Rivers East 
The election was won by Bennet Birrari of the National Republican Convention.

References 

Riv
Rivers State Senate elections
July 1992 events in Nigeria